Veselovsky is a surname. Notable people with the surname include:
Alexander Veselovsky (1838–1906), Russian literary theorist
Alexey Veselovsky (1843–1918), Russian literary historian and theorist, Alexander's brother
Nikolay Veselovsky (1848–1918), Russian archaeologist
Robert Veselovsky (born 1985), Slovak footballer

See also
Veselovský
Vesolovsky

Russian-language surnames